Stepney is a district in the East End of London, England.

Stepney may also refer to:

Places
 Stepney (London County Council constituency), 1949–1965
 Stepney (UK Parliament constituency), 1885–1918 and 1950–1974
 Stepney (parish), in the historic county of Middlesex, England
 Stepney, Kingston upon Hull, England
 Stepney, South Australia, Australia
 Stepney, Connecticut, US
 Metropolitan Borough of Poplar, former Borough of London

People
 Stepney (surname)
 Stepney baronets
 Stepney family

Other uses
 LB&SCR A1X class 55 Stepney, a preserved steam locomotive on the Bluebell Railway
 Stepney the "Bluebell" Engine, a character in The Railway Series by the Rev. W. Awdry
 A character in the television series Thomas & Friends
 Stepney, a character in the TV series The Wombles
 Stepney, a popular name for a spare tire
 Stepney (2019 film), a Marathi film directed by Aziz Naser